Grabówek  is a village in the administrative district of Gmina Tuplice, within Żary County, Lubusz Voivodeship, in western Poland.

References

Villages in Żary County